Gornja Meka Gruda is a village in the municipality of Bileća, Republika Srpska, Bosnia and Herzegovina.

References

See also 

Donja Meka Gruda

Villages in Republika Srpska
Populated places in Bileća
Villages in Bosnia and Herzegovina